Sallehuddin bin Mohamed (born 9 September 1932) was a Malaysian civil servant who served as the 8th Chief Secretary to the Government from 1984 to 1990.

Career
Sallehuddin appointed as Chief Secretary to the Government in 15 June 1984. After Sallehuddin left office as Chief Secretary to the Government on 31 January 1990 at the age of 58 (optional compulsory retirement), he was later appointed as new Chairman of the Employees Provident Fund Board on 26 May 1990.

Honours
 :
 Officer of the Order of the Defender of the Realm (KMN) (1970)
 Companion of the Order of the Defender of the Realm (JMN) (1976)
 Commander of the Order of Loyalty to the Crown of Malaysia (PSM) – Tan Sri (1982)
 Commander of the Order of the Defender of the Realm (PMN) – Tan Sri (1985)
 :
 Knight Commander of the Order of Loyalty to Sultan Abdul Halim Mu'adzam Shah (DHMS) – Dato' Paduka (1990)
 :
 Grand Knight of the Order of Sultan Ahmad Shah of Pahang (SSAP) – Dato' Sri (2009)
 :
 Knight Grand Companion of the Order of Sultan Sharafuddin Idris Shah (SSIS) – Dato' Setia (2009)

References 

Chief Secretaries to the Government of Malaysia
1932 births
Officers of the Order of the Defender of the Realm
Living people
Companions of the Order of the Defender of the Realm
Malaysian people of Malay descent
Commanders of the Order of Loyalty to the Crown of Malaysia
Malaysian Muslims
Commanders of the Order of the Defender of the Realm